Trois jours chez ma mère  is a novel by Belgian author François Weyergans. It was first published in 2005 and won the Prix Goncourt, one of the most prestigious awards in France.

See also
 2005 in literature
 Belgian literature

References

2005 Belgian novels
French-language novels
Prix Goncourt winning works